The Quaquerni or Querquerni were an ancient tribe of Gallaecia, living in the Baixa Limia region of southern Galicia, where the Roman fort of Aquis Querquennis has been found.

Ethnonym

Historical sources
The Quaquerni are also known by the name Quarquerni, Querquernoi, or Quacernoi. Scholars see a possible connection with Venetic Quarqueni, as registered by Pliny and located somewhere in historical Istria.

Etymology
The name Querquerni is probably related to Latin quercus ("oak"), which stems from Proto-Indo-European root *pérkʷus, meaning "oak". It is probably a Q-Celtic formation meaning "the Oak People / Warriors", related to:

 Middle Irish ceirt "apple-tree", Middle Welsh perth "bush", from *kʷerxt-, from an earlier *kʷerkʷt- < *perkʷt-
 the Continental Celtic toponyms Hercynian forest and the Pannonian tribe Hercuniates, where the early delabialization of kʷ before u prevented p.. kʷ > kʷ .. kʷ:Xavier Delamarre, La langue gauloise : Une approche linguistique du vieux celtique continental, éditions Errance, Paris, 2003, pp. 164 - 165. so *perkʷunia > *perkunia > *fercunia; note that there is no u after kʷ in *kʷerkʷern-. They are all related to the Germanic branch maybe borrowed from Pre-Celtic *percunia, that is to say : Gothic fairgunni "mountain (covered with oaks)", Anglo-Saxon firgen- "mountain wood", Old High German Fergunna, Virgundia waldus, etc.
 French place names derived from the forms Perciacum, Percoialum, Percunia, Percetum, Erciacum, etc.

Location
Ancient sources tell of a place named Aquae Quarquernae. Alternate names are Aquis Querquennis and Aquis Cercennis.

Relations to other tribes
The Quaquerni were a subdivision of the Gallaeci Bracarii.

See also
Pre-Roman peoples of the Iberian Peninsula

References

Bibliography
 [Querquerni https://www.lexilogos.com/latin/gaffiot.php?p=1296] in: Gaffiot, Félix (1934) Dictionnaire Illustré Latin-Français. Hachette.
 Bosch-Gimpera Pedro. Les mouvements celtiques. Essai de reconstitution (suite). In: Etudes Celtiques, vol. 6, fascicule 1, 1952. pp. 71–126. [DOI: https://doi.org/10.3406/ecelt.1952.1248] ; www.persee.fr/doc/ecelt_0373-1928_1952_num_6_1_1248
 Bosch-Gimpera, Pedro. Les mouvements celtiques. Essai de reconstitution (suite). In: Etudes Celtiques, vol. 6, fascicule 2, 1953. pp. 328–355. [DOI: https://doi.org/10.3406/ecelt.1953.1265] ; www.persee.fr/doc/ecelt_0373-1928_1953_num_6_2_1265
 Broëns, Maurice. L’Onomastique domaniale entre Plateau Central et Garonne au VIIe siècle, d’après les textes (suite). In: Revue Internationale d'Onomastique, 8e année N°4, décembre 1956. pp. 241–265. [DOI: https://doi.org/10.3406/rio.1956.1564] www.persee.fr/doc/rio_0048-8151_1956_num_8_4_1564
 Carnoy, Albert. Le chêne dans la toponymie et la linguistique. In: Revue Internationale d'Onomastique, 10e année N°2, juin 1958. pp. 81–101. [DOI: https://doi.org/10.3406/rio.1958.1615] ; www.persee.fr/doc/rio_0048-8151_1958_num_10_2_1615
 Falileyev, Alexander (1997). Dictionary of Continental Celtic Place-Names. Aberystwyth University. 2007 [1997]. Entries: Aquae Quarquernae and Quarquerni.
 Guerra, Amilcar. (2005). Povos, cultura e língua no Ocidente Peninsular: uma perspectiva, a partir da toponomástica. Palaeohispánica: Revista sobre lenguas y culturas de la Hispania Antigua, Nº. 5, 2005 (Ejemplar dedicado a: Actas del IX coloquio sobre lenguas y culturas paleohispánicas (Barcelona, 20-24 de octubre de 2004)), pp. 793–822.
 Luján Martinez, Eugenio R. (2006) "The Language(s) of the Callaeci," e-Keltoi: Journal of Interdisciplinary Celtic Studies: Vol. 6, Article 16. pp. 715–748. Available at: https://dc.uwm.edu/ekeltoi/vol6/iss1/16
 Moralejo, Juan J. "Labiovelares en material galaico y lusitano". In: Callaica Nomina: Estudios de Onomástica Gallega. Biblioteca Filolóxica Galega. Fundación Pedro Barrié de la Maza, D.L. 2007. pp. 209–243. [originally from: Verba, Anuario Galego de Filoloxía 30 (2003). pp. 33–58]
 Olivares Pedreno, Juan Carlos. Los Ástures del conventus lucensis y el culto al dios Lug en el noroeste de Hispania. In: Dialogues d'histoire ancienne, vol. 36, n°2, 2010. pp. 117–136.[DOI: https://doi.org/10.3406/dha.2010.3234] ; www.persee.fr/doc/dha_0755-7256_2010_num_36_2_3234
 Orejas, Almudena et Sastre Prat, Inés. Fiscalité et organisation du territoire dans le Nord-Ouest de la Péninsule Ibérique: civitates, tribut et ager mensura comprehensus. In: Dialogues d'histoire ancienne, vol. 25, n°1, 1999. pp. 159–188. [DOI: https://doi.org/10.3406/dha.1999.1529]; www.persee.fr/doc/dha_0755-7256_1999_num_25_1_1529
 Rivas Fernández, Juan Carlos. "Un nuevo testimonio epigráfico de los quarquerni y otras cuestiones en torno a la civitas de este pueble". In: Boletín Auriensem Tomo 9. 1979. pp. 51–66. 
 Rhys, John. "II. The Celts and the other Aryans of the P and Q'' Groups". In: Transactions of the Philological SocietyVolume 22, Issue 1. Oxford: Published for the Society by B. Blackwell. 1893 [December, 1891]. pp. 104–131. https://doi.org/10.1111/j.1467-968X.1891.tb00643.x
 Suarez, Plácido. "La estructuración territorial y étnica del Conventus Bracarensis". In: MINIUS. Revista do Departamento de Historia, Arte e Xeografía. Universidade de Vigo. Servizo de Publicacións. Nº X, 2002. pp. 111–134.

External links
Detailed map of the Pre-Roman Peoples of Iberia (around 200 BC)

Tribes of Gallaecia
Ancient peoples of Portugal